The Elizabeth Smart Story is a 2003 American made-for-television crime drama film about the high-profile Elizabeth Smart kidnapping case. It was broadcast less than eight months after her recovery. It was based on the book Bringing Elizabeth Home written by her parents, Ed and Lois Smart.

Plot
Fourteen-year-old Elizabeth Smart is part of a large and loving Mormon family. Her father Ed hires a handyman, a self-styled prophet named Immanuel, to help him with a remodeling job.

Months later, Immanuel returns and kidnaps Elizabeth one night at knifepoint. Her sister, Mary Katherine, who is in the bed with her, is too terrified to immediately tell her parents.

Once she does, a massive police investigation begins. The Smarts are angered when the investigation questions whether any family members are involved in Elizabeth’s disappearance. A massive search effort begins and the story causes a media frenzy. After a false news story that the police suspect a family member, Ed takes and passes a polygraph test.

Richard Ricci, who worked for the Smarts until he was fired when jewelry went missing, is arrested for a parole violation and the police suspect his involvement in Elizabeth's disappearance.

Immanuel subsequently tries to kidnap one of Elizabeth's cousins, but is unsuccessful.

The Smarts learn Ricci has had an aneurysm and is now brain dead.

After this, Elizabeth's mother gives up hope, the story fades into the background and the police stop looking for Elizabeth.

At one point, Mary Katherine realizes that it was Immanuel who took Elizabeth, but the police do not pursue this lead. Ed appears on the TV show America's Most Wanted and tells host John Walsh in confidence about this new information.

When Walsh reveals it on Larry King Live, the Smarts publish a sketch of Immanuel, who is later identified as Brian David Mitchell.

After having taken her to San Diego, Mitchell returns to Salt Lake City with his wife Wanda Ilene Barzee and Elizabeth. When the police accidentally come across the three of them and question them, Elizabeth identifies herself, resulting in Mitchell's arrest and Elizabeth's reunion with her family.

A postscript revealed that Elizabeth went back to high school and resumed her life. Both Brian and Wanda Barzee were sentenced to aggravated kidnapping, sexual assault and burglary, underwent mental competency evaluations with no court date set.

Cast
 Dylan Baker as Ed Smart
 Lindsay Frost as Lois Smart
 Amber Marshall as Elizabeth Smart
 Hannah Lochner as Mary Katherine Smart
 Tyler Kyte as Charles Smart
 Tom Everett as Brian David Mitchell (aka "Immanuel")
 Hollis McLaren as Wanda Ilene Barzee
 Kenneth McGregor as Richard Ricci 
 Robert Wisdin as Jim Smart
 Jacob Kraemer as Andrew Smart
 Bruce Gooch as John Walsh

Awards
Three of the film's stars were nominated for 2004 Young Artist Awards. Amber Marshall was nominated for the Best Performance in a TV Movie, Miniseries or Special - Leading Young Actress. Hannah Lochner was nominated for the Best Performance in a TV Movie, Miniseries or Special - Supporting Young Actress. Jacob Kraemer was nominated for the Best Performance in a TV Movie, Miniseries or Special - Supporting Young Actor.

References

Links

 

2003 television films
2003 films
2003 crime drama films
American crime drama films
Drama films based on actual events
Films about child abduction in the United States
Films about child abuse
Films based on non-fiction books
Films set in 2002
Films set in Utah
Films about narcissism
Crime films based on actual events
CBS network films
Films directed by Bobby Roth
Films scored by Christopher Franke
2000s English-language films
2000s American films